Moore High School may refer to:

 Bishop Moore High School, Orlando, Florida
 Moore Traditional High School, Louisville, Kentucky
 Moore High School (Montana), Moore, Montana 
 Moore Catholic High School, Staten Island, New York
 North Moore High School, Robbins, North Carolina
 Moore High School (Oklahoma), Moore, Oklahoma
 Moore County High School, Moore County, Tennessee
 Ingram Tom Moore High School, Ingram, Texas
 Newton Moore Senior High School, Perth, Western Australia